Alonso Guerrero Pérez (Almendralejo, Badajoz) on 12 November 1962) is a Spanish writer and professor. In addition to fiction, he has also written essays, literary criticism, and journalism.

Life
Born in Almendralejo (Badajoz), after his university studies he became a high school teacher. He was awarded some literature prizes: the prestigious "Premio Felipe Trigo" from Villanueva de la Serena (Badajoz) for his Tricotomía, in 1982; and the Premio Navarra de Novela for his Los años imaginarios in 1987.

On 7 August 1998 Alonso Guerrero married Letizia Ortiz, a Spanish journalist, in a simple civil ceremony at Almendralejo, after a 10-year courtship; they divorced in 1999, however. Ortiz would go on to marry the future King Felipe VI, thus becoming Queen of Spain.

Works
 Tricotomía (1982)
 Los años imaginarios (1987)
 Los ladrones de libros (Badajoz, Departamento de Publicaciones de la Excma. Diputación Provincial de Badajoz, 1991)
 El hombre abreviado (1998) 
 El durmiente (1998)
 Fin del milenio en Madrid (1999)
 De la indigencia a la literatura (2004)
 El edén de los autómatas (2004) 
 La muerte y su antídoto (2004) 
 Doce semanas del siglo XX (2007) 
 Un palco sobre la nada (2012) 
 Un día sin comienzo (2014), about the 2004 Madrid train bombings 
 El mundo sumergido (2016)  
 El amor de Penny Robinson (2018)

References

Spanish writers
1962 births
Living people